Hard Way is the eighth album of the Japanese hard rock band Show-Ya. The album was recorded in Los Angeles, USA and produced by Beau Hill and by Kip Winger's brother Paul. It was released on 24 October 1990 and reached position No. 4 in Japan (Oricon Chart). All the lyrics were written by Yoshihiko Andō. This time all the musical arrangements were done by the band. It would be Show-Ya's last studio album with lead singer Keiko Terada. The track "Uchi ni Kaerou" was used as theme song for the anime OVA Cleopatra DC.

Track listing
"Metallic Woman" (Miki Igarashi, Yoshihiko Andō) – 6:19
"Life Is Dancing" (Satomi Senba & Miki Tsunoda, Andō) – 4:41
"Switch Blade St." (Senba & Tsunoda, Andō) – 4:00
"Mashou" (魔性) (Miki Nakamura, Andō) – 4:47
"Naze" (何故) (Keiko Terada, Andō) – 6:31
"Make It Up – Dounikashite Yo –" (Make It Up ―どうにかしてよ―) (Igarashi, Andō) – 4:13
"Gambling" (ギャンブリング) (Igarashi, Andō) – 4:00
"Blue Rose Blues" (Terada, Andō) – 5:25
"Way You Rock Me" (Terada, Andō) – 3:27
"Uchi ni Kaerou" (うちにかえろう) (Terada, Andō) – 6:10
"Sakebi" (叫び) (Terada & Nakamura, Andō) – 4:27

Personnel

Band members
Keiko Terada – vocals
Miki Igarashi – guitars
Miki Nakamura – keyboards
Satomi Senba – bass
Miki Tsunoda – drums

Production
Paul Winger – producer
Beau Hill – executive producer
Scott Gordon, Patrick D. Karamians, Paul Wertheimer – engineers
Robert A. Vosgien – digital editing
Ted Jensen – mastering at Sterling Sound, New York
Yoshihiko Andō – lyrics

References

External links
Show-Ya discography 
"Sakebi" video clip
"Gambling" video clip

Show-Ya albums
1990 albums
EMI Records albums
Japanese-language albums